Peter Neustädter (born 16 February 1966) is a professional football manager and former player who played as a defender. He played for the Kazakhstan national team.

Club career
Neustädter played for Zenit Leningrad, CSKA Moscow, Iskra Smolensk, Dnipro Dnipropetrovsk, Tavriya Simferopol, Kairat Almaty, Spartak Vladikavkaz, and Karlsruher SC in the Bundesliga. After a short spell at Chemnitzer FC, he moved to Mainz 05 in 1994, where he finished his career as a player in 2004.

International career 
Neustädter played in 1996 twice for the Kazakhstan national team.

Coaching career
After retiring from professional playing, Neustädter played for and coached the German Oberliga team 1. FSV Mainz 05 II. His first match was a 1–0 loss to FC Nöttingen. Mainz II were eliminated in the first round of the 2005–06 DFB-Pokal against Karlsruher SC. Mainz II finished third in the 2005–06 Oberliga Südwest season. Then they finished second in the following season. Mainz II won the Oberliga Südwest during the 2007–08 season. Mainz II were promoted to the Regionalliga West and finished in fifth place during the 2008–09 season. Neustädter was head coach until 26 April 2010. His final match was a 3–1 loss against 1. FC Köln II. Mainz II were in 16th place when he left the club. On 17 September 2012, he was appointed as manager of TuS Koblenz. He was head coach until 20 August 2013.

Personal life
Neustädter was born in Kara-Balta in the Kirghiz SSR of the Soviet Union (now Kyrgyzstan). He is the son of a Volga German father and a Ukrainian mother. Since 1992 he has resided in Germany, and is a German citizen.

His son Roman Neustädter is a professional footballer for FC Dynamo Moscow, and represented both Germany and Russia at full international level. His younger brother Andrej Neustädter also had a brief career as a professional football player.

Coaching record

References

External links

 
 
 

1966 births
Living people
Soviet footballers
Kazakhstani footballers
Kazakhstan international footballers
German footballers
People from Kara-Balta
Kazakhstani emigrants to Germany
Russian and Soviet-German people
FC Spartak Vladikavkaz players
FC Dnipro players
Karlsruher SC players
1. FSV Mainz 05 players
Chemnitzer FC players
SC Tavriya Simferopol players
FC Kairat players
Soviet Top League players
Bundesliga players
2. Bundesliga players
Association football defenders
TuS Koblenz managers
1. FSV Mainz 05 II managers
Kazakhstani people of German descent
Citizens of Germany through descent
FC Iskra Smolensk players
German football managers
PFC CSKA Moscow players
FC Zenit Saint Petersburg players